Big Brother Brasil 12 was the twelfth season of Big Brother Brasil which premiered January 10, 2012 with the season finale airing March 29, 2012 on the Rede Globo television network.

The show is produced by Endemol Globo and presented by news reporter Pedro Bial. The season is officially confirmed since 2008 as part of a millionaire contract between international Endemol and Rede Globo, which guaranteed seasons until 2012.

The grand prize was R$1.5 million with tax allowances, with a R$150,000 prize offered to the runner up and a R$50,000 prize offered to the 3rd place. In the end, veterinarian Fael Cordeiro from Aral Moreira, MS, won the competition over poster-girl Fabiana Teixeira with 92% of the final vote.

Production

Development and overview
The twelfth season of Big Brother Brasil lasted for 80 days. In addition, this season includes new graphics, a new opening sequence and a tuneup in the musical score. It also changed its main housemates names and info font.

Cast
National applications were due by August 14, 2011 until October 31, 2011. 
Applicants chosen to be a finalist went to Rio de Janeiro during early November 2011 from which applicants were narrowed down to a pool of 150 finalists.

Final casting interviews took place early to mid-December 2011. The selected group of housemates were put into sequester on January 3, 2012.

Pre-season withdrawals controversy

Netinho
Twelve housemates were revealed on January 4. João José "Netinho" Neto, a 28-year-old lawyer from Visconde do Rio Branco walked during the pre-season sequester. At first, Rede Globo, the broadcaster of the program, stated that Netinho walked because he couldn't handle the confinement at the hotel.

The next day, however, Netinho's mother, Maria Ines Carmanini, came out stating that the producers tried to manipulate her son, forbidding him to maintain his daily routine. She also claimed that she couldn't specify the problem, since Netinho had signed a secrecy agreement with the network and such disclosure could harm him. Netinho was replaced on January 5 by Ronaldo Peres, a 31-year-old salesman from São Paulo.

On January 7, in an unexpected turn of events, it was revealed that Netinho would have regretted his decision and asked for another chance in the game. The producers however, denied the request. "Unfortunately, once you're out, you stay out" said Boninho, the main producer of the show. Netinho, on the other hand, denied the information and stated that he didn't have the producers' phone number and is happy with his decision.

Fernanda
Hours earlier in the day, Fernanda Girão, a 29-year-old businesswoman from Rio de Janeiro, also walked away from the show. Fernanda, who was expected to be one of the season's big characters, had already asked to leave 24 hours before the official announcement. In the first attempt, however, she was persuaded by Boninho to handle the pressure and stay in the game.

At first, the lack of a phone was believed to be the reason for Fernanda's departure. In crisis, she would have asked to call her mother, but the producers didn't allow her to do so. Fernanda also had trouble sleeping. For security reasons, Big Brother Brasil rules prohibits sleeping pills both at the hotel where pre-season sequester occurs and, subsequently, at the Big Brother house.
However, in an interview on January 9, Fernanda claimed to have walk to preserve her image after she learned in the hotel, that she was being portrayed by the media as a lesbian (as the girlfriend of the openly lesbian singer Nise Palhares, 3rd place on Ídolos 2010) and a troublemaker.

Fabiana Teixeira, a 35-year-old poster girl from São Paulo, was officially announced on January 9, 2012 as Fernanda's replacement.

The game
The season was a "back to basics" season with a reduced cast, no double evictions, no three-way vote and an unprecedented division in the group. In addition, only the final two housemates faced the public vote on the finale night.

Launch night twist
On January 8, it was revealed that Big Brother producers called 60 unsuccessful auditioners to make part of the audience at the launch night. All of them had gone through the entire selection process but didn't make to the final cut.

At the launch night, it was revealed that four more housemates would join the cast, bringing the total numbers of finalists to 16. The selection of the remaining finalists, however, was not random. These four new housemates – Analice, Daniel, Fael and Monique – were also chosen to be part of the season back in December 2011 and put into sequester alongside the, at the time believed to be, "original 12".

Season 1 challenge revival
All housemates competed in an endurance challenge for a chance to win an extra immunity for the first week. The challenge was the first to ever been done on Big Brother Brasil (on the series premiere in 2002) and consisted of all the housemates in a car and winner would be the last person standing. After 30 hours, a new record for the franchise, Kelly beat Jakeline and won the extra immunity, the car and the first Power of No (a new twist of the series).

Power of No
Like in the previous seasons, each week the housemates compete to become the Head of Household. However, a new twist called the Power of No was awarded in the first seven weeks to one housemate (except Week 3, where two housemates were awarded this power). The winner of the Power of No would be given the opportunity to disqualify up to five people from competing in the Head of Household competition.

In Week 1, the Power of No was given to Kelly as part of her prize for winning the endurance challenge in the season premiere. From Weeks 2–6, the Power of No competition replaced the Monday Game Night (held since season 9) but kept the same format, with elimination-style type of challenges as a way to create drama and conflict between the housemates. In Week 7, the last Power of No was given to Jonas, after he answered the last Big Phone that week.

The current Head of Household was also not eligible to compete in the following HoH competition unless only 6 housemates were remaining.

Big Phone
Although the Big Phone is still part of the game since season 8, in this season only rang 4 out of 14 nominations rounds and none automatic nominations for eviction.

Housemate exchange
From March 8 to March 15, 2012, Laisa Portella was a guest on Gran Hermano 13, where she spent seven days in the Spanish house as part of the Brazilian Week. The following week (March 16 to March 21, 2012), Spanish housemate Noemí Merino, a 25-year-old surfer from Lanzarote, spent five days in the Brazilian house.

Housemates
The cast list was unveiled on January 4, 2012.

(ages stated at time of contest)

Future appearances
In 2013, Yuri Fernandes returned to compete in Big Brother Brasil 13, he finished in 13th place.

In 2015, Kelly Medeiros appeared in A Quinta from Portugal, she won the competition.

In 2017, Yuri Fernandes and Monique Amin appeared in A Fazenda 9, where they placed 6th and 7th respectively.

Voting history

Notes

 :  During the launch night, the housemates competed in an endurance challenge for a chance to win an extra immunity. The challenge consisted of all the housemates in a car and winner would be the last person standing. After 30 hours, Kelly beat Jakeline and won the immunity, the car and the first Power of No. She vetoed five housemates from the first HoH competition (Fael, João M., Laisa, Monique and Renata).
 : Daniel had to leave the house after a rape charge against Monique. He was ejected due to a serious misconduct.
 :  Fael answered the Big Phone and had to choose one housemate to receive an extra immunity (João Mauricio).
 : Laisa answered the Big Phone on day 25 and won the Higher Power. Unknown to her fellow housemates, she could overthrow the HoH or the power of immunity and replace the nominations. However, this power could only be used once and within the next two evictions (weeks 4 and 5). Laisa played her Higher Power on week 5 to overthrow the original Power of Immunity holder, Yuri. She decided to change Yuri's decision (Monique) and gave the immunity to Yuri himself.
 :  Kelly answered the Big Phone and won an extra immunity. However, she should keep this secret until the vote, so she should put a bracelet on her least favorite housemate (Yuri) as a way to fool everyone.
 : Originally, Yuri won the Head of Household but due to a production error during the semifinal between Yuri and Fabiana (with Fael already in the final after beating João C. in the other semifinal) the HoH was voided and a new final was made between Fabiana and Fael, with Fael ended up winning. As Fael won the original Power of Immunity, but became the Head of Household after the re-do HoH competition, a new PoI competition was also made, with Renata winning the PoI.
 : Jonas answered the Big Phone and won the Power of No. He should put a bracelet on his choices (Monique and Rafa) and keep this as secret until the live show, which would be on the same day.
 : On day 45, host Pedro Bial revealed that Jonas' Power of No would be the last one of the season. From weeks 8 to 10, only the previous week's HoH would be ineligible to compete.
 : Kelly and Yuri received the most nominations with 4 each. Fabiana, as Head of Household, had the casting vote and choose Yuri to be the second nominee.
 : On day 57, Big Brother revealed to the audience that the winner of the ninth and final Power of Immunity competition, instead of give immunity to someone else, would win the immunity. Monique won the PoI on day 61, but the housemates were only informed about the twist during the live nominations on day 62.
 : Fael and Kelly received the most nominations with 2 each. Fabiana, as Head of Household, had the casting vote and choose Fael to be the second nominee.
 : Fabiana won the Head of Household and nominated Jonas for eviction. Since Fael and Kelly's votes would cancel each other out, only Jonas was eligible to nominate. He choose Kelly to be the second nominee.
 : Fabiana won the final Head of Household competition. Therefore, Fael and Jonas were automatically nominated for eviction by default.

Ratings and reception

Brazilian ratings
All numbers are in points and provided by IBOPE.

 Episodes aired: Mondays to Saturdays (except Wednesdays) at 10:00pm, Wednesdays at 9:45pm and Sundays at 11:00pm.

 Each point represents 60.000 households in São Paulo.

References

External links
 Official Site 

2012 Brazilian television seasons
12